Emilianópolis is a municipality in the state of São Paulo in Brazil. The population is 3,227 (2020 est.) in an area of 225 km2. The elevation is 354 m.

References

Municipalities in São Paulo (state)